Bagé River is a river of Acre state in western Brazil.

See also
List of rivers of Acre

References

Rivers of Acre (state)